Ling Te-Sheng (24 December 1928 – 29 December 2018) was a Taiwanese athlete. He competed in the men's long jump at the 1956 Summer Olympics.

References

1928 births
2018 deaths
Athletes (track and field) at the 1956 Summer Olympics
Taiwanese male long jumpers
Olympic athletes of Taiwan